Sir Samuel Squire Sprigge  (22 June 1860 – 17 June 1937) was an English physician, medical editor, and medical writer.

Biography
After education at Uppingham School from 1873 to 1878, he matriculated on 1 October 1878 at Caius College, Cambridge, graduating there BA in 1882. After medical training at St George's Hospital he qualified MRCS in 1886 and graduated MB BChir from the University of Cambridge in 1887. (At St George's Hospital he was surgical assistant to Timothy Holmes.)

Sprigge was house surgeon to West London Hospital, house physician to the Brompton Hospital, and clinical assistant to the Children's Hospital, Great Ormond Street. He practised for sometime in Mayfair, London. In 1904 he graduated MA and MD from the University of Cambridge.

In 1911 Sprigge was president of the Society of Authors. During the early part of WWI, Sprigge, with Dr. H. A. Des Voeux, organised and administered the Belgian Doctors' and Pharmacists' Relief Fund. For this charitable work, Sprigge was awarded the Médaille du Roi Albert in 1919. In 1921 he was knighted. He was elected FRCS in 1921 and FRCP in 1927. In 1928 in Boston he delivered the Hunterian lecture to the American College of Surgeons.

Squire Sprigge was a member of the United University Club and the Savile Club.

Selected publications

Articles

Books

 
 

as editor: 
 

as editor:

References

1860 births
1937 deaths
19th-century English medical doctors
20th-century English medical doctors
People educated at Uppingham School
Alumni of Gonville and Caius College, Cambridge
Fellows of the Royal College of Physicians
Fellows of the Royal College of Surgeons
Knights Bachelor
The Lancet editors